Malik Benjamin "Shake" Milton (born September 26, 1996), nicknamed "Sniper Shake", is an American professional basketball player for the Philadelphia 76ers of the National Basketball Association (NBA). He played college basketball for Southern Methodist University (SMU) from 2015 to 2018. Milton was drafted 54th overall in the 2018 NBA draft by the Dallas Mavericks and previously played for the Delaware Blue Coats of the NBA G League.

High school career
Milton played under Coach Mark Vancuren at Owasso High School in Owasso, Oklahoma, earning Gatorade Player of the Year honors for the state of Oklahoma in the 2013–14, and 2014–15 seasons. He averaged 29.7 points and 4.4 assists as a senior (2014–15) on his way to being named Tulsa World Player of the Year, Oklahoma Super 5 Player of the Year, and Oklahoma Coaches Association ALL-STATE. He committed to SMU over University of Oklahoma and Indiana University.

College career
In his freshman year at SMU, Milton saw the hardwood in 30 games (23 starts) to average 10.5 points, 3.0 boards and 2.7 assists a contest, while earning AAC All-Rookie Team distinction.

In the summer of 2016, he was a member of the US Select Team for the Goodwill Tour in Croatia.

The 2016–17 season saw him start in all 35 games and produce averages of 13.0 points, 4.5 assists and 1.3 steals per outing, he made the All-American Athletic Conference Second Team as a sophomore. In the 2017–18 campaign, Milton appeared in 22 games for the Mustangs, averaging 18.0 points, 4.7 rebounds, 4.4 assists and 1.4 steals per game before a broken right hand ended his season. He was named to the All-AAC Second Team for a second season.

Professional career

Philadelphia 76ers (2018–present)
Milton was selected by the Dallas Mavericks in the second round (54th pick overall) in the 2018 NBA draft. He was subsequently traded to the Philadelphia 76ers for the rights to the 56th and 60th picks, Ray Spalding and Kostas Antetokounmpo, respectively. On July 26, Milton signed a two-way contract with Philadelphia, which would split his playing time between the 76ers and their NBA G League affiliate, the Delaware Blue Coats. Milton made his NBA debut on November 30, 2018 against the Washington Wizards, scoring five points and recording two assists. As a rookie, Milton appeared in 20 games for the Sixers, averaging 4.4 points, 1.8 rebounds, and 0.9 assists in 13.4 minutes per game. Milton scored a career high 13 points when playing against the Orlando Magic on March 25, 2019. Milton also averaged 24.9 points (4th-best in the G-League), 5.2 assists, and 4.8 rebounds per game in 27 contests for the Blue Coats.

Before the start of the 2019–20 season, Milton signed a four-year deal with Philadelphia. Milton was injured early in the season and missed time. After returning to the 76ers, Milton made his first career start January 25, 2020 against the Los Angeles Lakers, with seven points, three assists and a career-high nine rebounds. Later that month, in his third career start, he set new career highs in assists with 6 and points with 27, passing his previous career high of 13 in the first half, in a loss to the Atlanta Hawks. On March 1, 2020, Milton scored a career-high 39 points in 136–130 loss to the Los Angeles Clippers and tied an NBA record for most consecutive made three-pointers (13) over a span of three games. Milton would go on to start 24 games that season for the 76ers, posting career highs in multiple different statistical categories.

Career statistics

NBA

Regular season

|-
| style="text-align:left;"|
| style="text-align:left;"|Philadelphia
| 20 || 0 || 13.4 || .391 || .318|| .714 || 1.8 || .9 || .4 || .4 || 4.4
|-
| style="text-align:left;"|
| style="text-align:left;"|Philadelphia
| 40 || 24 || 20.1 || .484 || .430 || .785 || 2.2 || 2.6 || .5 || .2 || 9.4
|-
| style="text-align:left;"|
| style="text-align:left;"|Philadelphia
| 60 || 4 || 23.2 || .450 || .350 || .830 || 2.3 || 3.1 || .6 || .3 || 13.0
|-
| style="text-align:left;"|
| style="text-align:left;"|Philadelphia
| 55 || 6 || 21.4 || .429 || .323 || .836 || 2.6 || 2.5 || .5 || .3 || 8.2
|- class="sortbottom"
| style="text-align:center;" colspan="2"|Career
| 178 || 34 || 20.9 || .447 || .361 || .819 || 2.3 || 2.6 || .5 || .3 || 9.7

Playoffs

|-
| style="text-align:left;"|2020
| style="text-align:left;"|Philadelphia
| 4 || 4 || 31.5 || .477 || .400 || .857 || 3.3 || 2.8 || .5 || .0 || 14.5
|-
| style="text-align:left;"|2021
| style="text-align:left;"|Philadelphia
| 12 || 0 || 10.1 || .319 || .421 || .933 || .8 || .8 || .3 || .1 || 4.3
|-
| style="text-align:left;"|2022
| style="text-align:left;"|Philadelphia
| 12 || 0 || 13.2 || .474 || .533 || .800 || 1.6 || .9 || .5 || .3 || 5.0
|- class="sortbottom"
| style="text-align:center;" colspan="2"|Career
| 28 || 4 || 14.5 || .419 || .441 || .857 || 1.5 || 1.1 || .4 || .1 || 6.1

College

|-
| style="text-align:left;"|2015–16
| style="text-align:left;"|SMU
| 30 || 23 || 32.7 || .477 || .426 || .725 || 3.0 || 2.7 || .8 || .3 || 10.5
|-
| style="text-align:left;"|2016–17
| style="text-align:left;"|SMU
| 35 || 35 || 35.4 || .437 || .423 || .758 || 4.1 || 4.5 || 1.3 || .3 || 13.0
|-
| style="text-align:left;"|2017–18
| style="text-align:left;"|SMU
| 22 || 22 || 36.4 || .449 || .434 || .847 || 4.7 || 4.4 || 1.4 || .6 || 18.0
|- class="sortbottom"
| style="text-align:center;" colspan="2"|Career
| 87 || 80 || 34.7 || .452 || .427 || .791 || 3.9 || 3.9 || 1.1 || .4 || 13.4

References

External links

 SMU Mustangs bio

1996 births
Living people
African-American basketball players
American men's basketball players
Basketball players from Oklahoma
Dallas Mavericks draft picks
Delaware Blue Coats players
Parade High School All-Americans (boys' basketball)
People from Owasso, Oklahoma
Philadelphia 76ers players
Shooting guards
Small forwards
SMU Mustangs men's basketball players
21st-century African-American sportspeople